PP-156 Lahore-XIII is a Constituency of Provincial Assembly of Punjab.

General elections 2018

See also
 PP-155 Lahore-XII
 PP-157 Lahore-XIV

References

External links
 Election commission Pakistan's official website
 Awazoday.com check result
 Official Website of Government of Punjab

Provincial constituencies of Punjab, Pakistan